Mihai Volontir (9 March 1934 – 15 September 2015) was a Soviet and Moldovan actor. People's Artist of the USSR (1984).

Biography

Volontir was born on 9 March 1934 in the village of Glinjeni, Moldova. He attended the Pedagogical Institution in Orhei from 1952 to 1955.

After over a decade of working in theatre, Volontir began appearing in films made at the Moldova-Film studio in 1967. He became famous in the late 1970s after his roles in In the Zone of Special Attention and The Gypsy film series. The films were so popular that he is still strongly associated with his character, Budulai, a wise lone gypsy. His performance resulted in increased tolerance towards gypsy communities in the Soviet Union. The film series was revived fifteen years later with a new production as well as a TV series.

Volontir worked at the Vasile Alecsandri Theatre in Bălţi, where he was employed as an actor from 1957 until his death in 2015.

He was also a supporter of the Romanian identity.

17 September 2015, the day of his funeral, was declared a day of National Mourning in Moldova.

Filmography

Awards 
 Order of the Republic (Moldova)
 Vasilyev Brothers State Prize of the RSFSR (1980)
 People's Artist of the USSR (1984)

See also
 Cinema of Moldova

References

External links

 
 Volontir biography and photos

People from Șoldănești District
1934 births
2015 deaths
Moldovan male film actors
Moldovan MPs 1990–1994
Recipients of the Order of the Republic (Moldova)
Moldovan male stage actors
Romanian people of Moldovan descent